José Ignacio de Sanjinés Barriga (1786 – August 15, 1864) was a Bolivian poet and legislator.

Background and relation with historical events
Born in Chuquisaca, he was a delegate to the Asambleas Deliberante y Constituyente (Deliberative and Constituent Assemblies) of 1825 and 1826, when Bolivia first became an independent republic. 

He signed the Bolivian Declaration of Independence and the first Bolivian Constitution.

Writer of lyrics of Bolivian national anthem
Sanjinés is perhaps best known for writing the lyrics to the National Anthem of Bolivia.

Themes of lyrics
His lyrics were meant to inspire patriotism, hatred of tyranny and love of freedom, and admiration for Bolivian soldiers who had recently won Bolivia's war of independence against Spain.

Death
He died in Sucre in 1864.

References

1786 births
1864 deaths
People from Chuquisaca Department
19th-century Bolivian politicians
Bolivian male writers
National anthem writers